The 2016 Morgan State Bears football team represented Morgan State University in the 2016 NCAA Division I FCS football season. They were led by interim head coach Frederick Farrier, who was appointed to the position after Lee Hull accepted a position with the Indianapolis Colts of the National Football League. The Bears played their home games at Hughes Stadium. They were a member of the Mid-Eastern Athletic Conference (MEAC). They finished the season 3–8, 3–5 in MEAC play to finish in a three-way tie for seventh place.

Schedule

The game between Morgan State and Savannah State was postponed in advance of the arrival of Hurricane Matthew. The game was rescheduled for November 26 on October 7, 2016.
Source: Schedule

References

Morgan State
Morgan State Bears football seasons
Morgan State Bears football